Look What I Got! is a 1988 album by the American jazz singer Betty Carter.

At the 31st Grammy Awards, Carter's performance on this album won her the Grammy Award for Best Jazz Vocal Performance, Female.

Track listing
For the 1992 Verve CD Issue, 835661-2.
"Look What I Got!" (Betty Carter) – 5:41
"That Sunday, That Summer" (Joe Sherman, George David Weiss) – 4:51
"The Man I Love" (George Gershwin, Ira Gershwin) – 7:28
"All I Got" (Diane Cole) – 4:40
"Just Like the Movies" (Time) (Carter) – 4:20
"Imagination" (Johnny Burke, Jimmy Van Heusen) – 4:23
"Mr. Gentleman" (Sequel to "Tight") (Carter) – 2:40
"Make It Last" (Bob Haymes) – 6:00
"The Good Life" (Sacha Distel, Jack Reardon) – 6:58

Personnel 
 Betty Carter - vocals
 Benny Green - piano
 Stephen Scott - piano
 Michael Bowie - double bass
 Lewis Nash - drums, guitar
 Winard Harper - drums

References

1988 albums
Betty Carter albums
Verve Records albums
Grammy Award for Best Jazz Vocal Performance, Female